Andreas Maurer (born 8 March 1958) is a former tennis player from West Germany.

Maurer won one singles title (1985, Madrid) and two doubles titles (1984, Stuttgart outdoor and 1986, Geneva) during his professional career. The right-hander reached his career-high singles ATP-ranking in May 1986, when he became the world No. 24. His best doubles ranking of world No. 53 was achieved in March 1983

Grand Prix career finals

Singles: 1 (1–0)

Doubles: 2 (2–0)

External links
 
 
 

1958 births
Living people
Sportspeople from Gelsenkirchen
West German male tennis players
Tennis people from North Rhine-Westphalia
20th-century German people